74 Days of Love is a Burmese fantasy, mystery, romance, drama television series. It aired on MNTV, from 24 August to 30 September 2020, on Mondays to Fridays at 20:00 for 28 episodes.

Synopsis 
The story depicts a romantic and fantastical tale of a boy named Moe Nat Thar (The god of rain) and a girl he meets accidentally at the Thingyan Water Festival, named "Ka Nyar/Thu Thu San." Although they had been a couple for a long time, they separated after promising to meet again when the Padauk flower blossomed. When Moe Nat Thar arrived on the earth, he lived in Ka Nyar's home, they grew closer, but after 74 days, Moe Nat Thar had to return to his own place. The story concludes with a heartbreaking ending.

Cast
Khar Ra as deity of sky (Moe Nat Thar)
Moe Yan Zun as Ati deity (Ati Nat Thar)
Myat Noe Aye as Thu Thu San
Pyae Wade Maung as Moon fairy (Sanda Nat Thamee)
May Thu Htun as May Chit Tone
Htet Oo Htut as Min Khant

References

Burmese television series
Myanmar National TV original programming